Reidar Kvammen (23 July 1914 – 27 October 1998) was a Norwegian footballer. Kvammen was an inside-forward who played his entire career for Viking, and is regarded as one of Norway's greatest footballers of all time. Kvammen was the first Norwegian footballer to reach 50 caps. Overall, he played 51 internationals and scored 17 goals for Norway.

Kvammen was a prominent member of the Norwegian bronze-medal winning team in the 1936 Olympics, and also played in the World Cup two years later. At club level, he scored 202 goals, which to this date is still a Viking club record.

After his career as player, Kvammen had spells as coach at Molde, Bryne and Viking.

Personal life
Kvammen was born in Stavanger, the son of shoemaker Rasmus Andreas Kvammen and Janna Kvammen, and worked as a police officer. He married Anna Martea Steen in 1942. During the German occupation of Norway Kvammen was sent to a concentration camp in German-occupied Poland. He was imprisoned in August 1943 and held in prison in Stavanger, then in Grini concentration camp from August to December 1943, then in Stutthof concentration camp until the end of the war.

His autobiography, 50 ganger på Norges landslag, was issued in 1949.

References

Footnotes

Bibliography

External links
profile

1914 births
1998 deaths
Sportspeople from Stavanger
Norwegian footballers
Norway international footballers
Viking FK players
Footballers at the 1936 Summer Olympics
Olympic footballers of Norway
Olympic bronze medalists for Norway
1938 FIFA World Cup players
Norwegian football managers
Viking FK managers
Molde FK managers
Bryne FK managers
Olympic medalists in football
Grini concentration camp survivors
Stutthof concentration camp survivors
Norwegian autobiographers
Medalists at the 1936 Summer Olympics
Association football forwards